Oksana Stefanivna Hrytsay (born on 5 March 1986), professionally known as Mika Newton, is a Ukrainian singer and actress from the city of Burshtyn. Born and raised in Ukraine, the singer currently resides in Los Angeles, California.

Childhood

Newton found her own voice as a child growing up in the town of Burshtyn, in the western part of Ukraine. Mika taught herself to sing at an early age by imitating famous artists she heard on the radio. She began begging her mother to invite friends over so she could have an audience to perform in front of. "I didn't know if I wanted to be a singer, but I knew I loved performing," says Mika. By age nine, she was entering regional voice competitions. This gave Mika her first taste of a real stage – and she wanted more. "I'm so honest on stage," she says. "It's when I'm my true self. I think the more honest you are, the more people will connect with you, and that's when you can really make an impact."

It wasn't until she saw a video of Michael Jackson performing his international sensation "Earth Song" that Mika decided to pursue her dream. "I didn't know who he was or where he was from, but the passion in his performance was inspiring," she says. Mika quickly enrolled in performing arts school where she studied voice, piano, acting, dance and pantomime. She continued to compete in both local and international talent competitions, taking first place in nearly every one of them. At the age of 16, Mika moved from her hometown of Burshtyn to Kyiv, where she studied out of the Vocal Department at the College of Circus and Variety Arts. While attending a performing arts school as a teenager (where she studied voice, piano, acting, dance, and pantomime), she continued to compete in local and international talent contests, taking first place at nearly all of them, which led to attention from music industry players, at the age of 16 she got signed with the record label Falyosa Family Factory. Her first name, Mika, is a derivative from Mick Jagger's first name and Newton stands for a new tone.  Besides making her way up in vocal career, Mika Newton is pursuing acting. She has already starred in two films – "Life By Surprise" and "Money For Daughter" where she played a supporting role and a lead role respectively.

Eurovision 2011

Newton was originally chosen on February 26, 2011 to represent Ukraine in the Eurovision Song Contest 2011 in Düsseldorf, Germany among 43 other countries, with her entry "Angel".

The Final of the national selection of participants from Ukraine for Eurovision song contest aired live on First National Television Channel. There were 19 participants. The winner was determined by SMS votes (45% of the vote), Internet voting (10%), and the jury votes (45%). The greatest number of points was received Mika Newton. Zlata Ognevich took the second place and Jamala took the third place.

In the Eurovision final on 14 May 2011 Newton finished fourth with 159 points, behind the entries from Azerbaijan (the winner with 221 points), Italy and Sweden. During her performance, she was accompanied by sand-artist Kseniya Simonova who was the 2009 winner of Ukraine's Got Talent.

Career

Before Eurovision Song Contest, Mika went on to release two albums and, thanks to providing theme songs to a number of popular Ukrainian and Russian films and television shows, earned herself the nickname, the "Queen of Soundtracks." It wasn't long before she drew interest from JK Music Group. They invited Mika to Los Angeles for a two-week recording session with legendary songwriter Walter Afanasieff, whose resume includes several Mariah Carey and Celine Dion hits. Mika also got the opportunity to perform in front of Grammy Award-winning producer Randy Jackson. "I could feel his [Randy's] energy, and knew right away he was something special," she says.

After winning 4th-place in Eurovision Song Contest 2011, Mika Newton signed a contract with JK Music Group and Randy Jackson's Friendship Collective. In June 2011 she moved to Los Angeles, where she started developing her music career as a pop-rock singer in the USA.

Mika has since devoted herself entirely to her work. She spends most of her days either locked in the recording studio, practicing her English, or attending acting classes.

Mika is strongly committed to charitable work. She frequents events at foster homes and juvenile detention centers and participates in auctions to benefit disadvantaged youth. "I feel I have a strong message for young people. I want to share my experiences and show them that yes, you can achieve your dreams if you're willing to work hard. Just don't ever quit. No matter what."

On February 21, 2012, Mika released her debut American single, "Don't Dumb Me Down.". Directed by Marc Klasfeld, who has worked with the likes of Katy Perry, Avril Lavigne, and Jay-Z, the video premiered on MTV's Buzzworthy and came in the top 5 highest rated, most viewed, most shared videos of the week on their official website.

Besides promoting her new U.S. single, Mika has captured the attention of the Chinese Media. In March 2012, she traveled to make a guest-appearance on "Maoren Queen," a reality show similar to "The Hills".

In March 2013, Mika Newton released her new single, "Come Out and Play" remixed by Paul Oakenfold creating the summers dancefloor anthem on Randy Jackson's Friendship Collective label.
"Come Out and Play"  has been remixed by British heavyweight DJ/Producer Paul Oakenfold. An eye for spotting talent, Oakenfold has remixed productions for artists including Madonna, The Rolling Stones, Snoop Dogg, Britney Spears, Justin Timberlake and most recently, Bruno Mars. Promoting the new remix Mika Newton and Paul Oakenfold made an exclusive performance at this years', Winter Music Conference in Miami Beach.

In April 2013, Mika began performing acoustic shows throughout Los Angeles.

On May 20, 2013, Newton's new music video for her song "Magnets" (co-written by Newton and songwriters Rune Westerberg and Victoria Horn) premiered exclusively on OK! Magazine USA official website.

In June 2013, she was selected as the Best Vocalist of the Month by SingerUniverse for her song "Magnets." SingerUniverse is an online magazine founded by a group of acclaimed music industry professionals. Each month, they spotlight a single rising star with their "Best Vocalist of the Month" contest.

On August 31, Newton debuted the music video for her second American single "Come Out and Play" at the Lily Bar & Lounge in Las Vegas. The video was directed by Ali Zamani, who's worked with the likes of Snoop Dogg, T-Pain, and Lil Way.

She was featured in the October issue of "MAXIM" magazine, and the January 2014 issue of "Chulo Magazine" 

After a message from Ukrainian President Volodymyr Zelenskyy, Newton sang at the 2022 Grammy Awards with John Legend and fellow Ukrainian artists Siuzanna Iglidan and Lyuba Yakimchuk in a performance that paid tribute to the lives lost during the 2022 Russian invasion of Ukraine.

Personal life
In December 2018, she married Chris Saavedra in the United States.

In October 2020, she announced on Instagram that she had been diagnosed with ovarian cancer in late 2019 at the age of 33; following surgery and treatment, she has been in remission as of October 2020.

Newton's sister has been serving in the Ukrainian Army during the 2022 Russian invasion of Ukraine.

References

External links

  Mika Newton official site
 official fan club
 official channel on Youtube

1986 births
Living people
21st-century Ukrainian women singers
Ukrainian rock singers
People from Burshtyn
Eurovision Song Contest entrants for Ukraine
Eurovision Song Contest entrants of 2011
English-language singers from Ukraine
Ukrainian pop musicians
Ukrainian emigrants to the United States